Peulla Airport  is an airport serving Peulla (es), a village near the shore of Todos los Santos Lake in the Los Lagos Region of Chile. The village is at the head of the fjord-like lake, where the Peulla River empties into it.

There is nearby steep mountainous terrain in all quadrants except along an approach from the lake.

See also

Transport in Chile
List of airports in Chile

References

External links
OpenStreetMap - Peulla
OurAirports - Peulla
SkyVector - Peulla
FallingRain - Peulla Airport

Airports in Chile
Airports in Los Lagos Region